Sankt Annæ Gade 4 is a historic property on Sankt Annæ Gade in the Christianshavn neighborhood of Copenhagen, Denmark. Built as a warehouse in the 1620s, in 1757 it was converted into a two-storey residential building by anchor smith Hans Caspersen. The first of a number of construction projects undertaken by Caspersen in the neighborhood, he would later also build or significantly expand the buildings at Overgaden Neden Vandet 39, Overgaden Neden Vandet 33 and Overgaden Oven Vandet 50. The building was listed on the Danish registry of protected buildings and places in 1950.

History
 
The building was originally part of a long  warehouse that was associated with the Mikkel Vibehouse at the corner of Strandgade and Sankt Annæ Gade. The Mikkel Vibe House was from 1736 to 1756 owned by Svend Svendsen, who worked as warehouse manager for the Danish Asiatic Company on the other side of the street. On  18 January 1757, Svendsen sold 12 bays of the 20-bay warehouse were acquired to anchor smith Hans Caspersen. He had for some years been a co-owner of the adjacent building at the corner of Sankt Annæ Gade and Wildersgade (then Kongensgade). He immediately embarked on converting his new property into a two-storey residential building. He also constructed a three-storey gatehouse on an adjacent site to the left of the former warehouse. The gateway opened to a yard with a workshop building and a water pump. A dide wing with a forge in the ground floor extended from the gatehouse. 

In 1760, Caspersen sold the property to blacksmith Friedrich Matthiesen Rom. Caspersen would later engage in a number of other construction projects in the area, including the construction or expansion of Overgaden Neden Vandet 39, Overgaden Neden Vandet 33 and Overgaden Oven Vandet 50.

The following year Sankt Annæ Gade 4 changed hands again when it was sold to distiller Johan Gregersen Flyche. In 1795, the building was sold to manager of Gerup Brickyard Knud Rasmussen Knudsen. On 20 January that same year he sold it to master cooper Mads Christensen Hall (1766–1839).

The building was listed on the Danish registry of protected buildings and places in 1950.

Architecture
 
The two-storey former warehouse is a simple, white-painted building with a red tile roof. The facade towards the street is constructed in brick. It features 12 wall anchors and is finished by a white cornice. Cellar entrances are located in the southernmost bay as well as in the third bay from the north. The rear side of the building is constructed with timber framing. It is yellow-washed on the ground floor while the timber framing is exposed on the upper floor.

Caspersen's three-storey gatehouse was heightened with one storey in 1799. The apartments in the former warehouse are accessed through a door in the gateway of the gatehouse. A side wing extends from the rear side of the building.

See also
 Overgaden Neden Vandet 39

References

External links

Listed residential buildings in Copenhagen